"Papal donation" refers to two sets of papal bulls by which Pope Nicholas V, in 1454, and Pope Alexander VI, in 1493, purported to give the Catholic monarchs of Portugal and Spain, respectively, the prerogative to explore the Americas. Alexander's bull, proclaimed on 4 May 1493, was titled Inter caetera and addressed to Ferdinand and Isabella, the Catholic Monarchs of Spain, and later Catholic monarchs of Spain. England and France opposed the papal donation. Jurists including Francisco de Vitoria and Francisco Suárez argued that the pope did not have power to award territory to sovereigns.

Citations

Works cited 
 
 
 
 
 

Canon law history
Portuguese colonization of the Americas
Spanish colonization of the Americas